Randy White may refer to:

Randy White (American football) (born 1953), American football player
Randy White (basketball) (born 1967), American basketball player
Randy White (Canadian politician) (born 1948), Canadian politician and accountant
Randy White (pastor) (born 1958), American pastor of Without Walls Central Church
Randy White (West Virginia politician) (born 1955), West Virginia state senator
Randy Wayne White (born 1950), American writer of crime fiction and non-fiction adventure

See also
Randy Wright, American football quarterback and color commentator